Three Dog Site, RI-151 is an archaeological site in North Smithfield, Rhode Island, United States.

The site features Late Archaic and prehistoric archeological evidence and was added to the National Historic Register in 1984.

References

Archaeological sites on the National Register of Historic Places in Rhode Island
Buildings and structures in Providence County, Rhode Island
National Register of Historic Places in Providence County, Rhode Island